Always… is the debut studio album of the Dutch band The Gathering. The record was initially released on 9 June 1992, in Europe by Foundation 2000 and in North America by Pavement Music. In 1994, a first remixed version of the album was released by Foundation 2000. In 1999, a second remixed version was released by Psychonaut Records. The Mexican edition was released by Scarecrow Records.

Track listing

The Mexican version features three additional tracks from the compilation album Downfall.

Credits
The Gathering
Bart Smits – vocals, backing vocals
Jelmer Wiersma – electric and 12 string acoustic guitars
René Rutten – electric and acoustic guitars
Hans Rutten – drums, wind chimes
Frank Boeijen – keyboards, grand piano
Hugo Prinsen Geerligs – bass, flute, triangle

Additional musicians
Marike Groot – female vocals
Henk van Koeverden – electronics, Korg MS-10

Production
Recorded and mixed at the Beaufort Recording Studio, Bovenkarspel, the Netherlands from 28 February 1992, to 7 March 1992.
Produced and mixed by Han Swagerman Sr. and The Gathering.
Engineered by Han Swagerman Sr.
Executive producer: Mark Fritsma

References

External links
Always... at The Gathering's official website (archived)

1992 debut albums
The Gathering (band) albums